Antoine-Félix Boisselier (22 May 1790 – 29 April 1857), known as Boisselier le Jeune to distinguish him from his brother Félix Boisselier, was a French painter.

Career 
A native of Paris, he was of the same generation as Camille Corot and Achille Etna Michallon. He studied with his brother and Jean-Victor Bertin, and is known to have visited Italy around 1811, in which year he painted two oil studies of that country. He first entered the Salon in 1812, and exhibited frequently thereafter; in 1824, he won a second-class medal. In 1827, he entered the first Prix de Rome competition for historical landscape. He placed second behind Michalllon, but nevertheless appears to have traveled to Italy soon thereafter. Many of his Salon entries, and many images he submitted to provincial salons, were views of Italian sites and historical landscapes. Later in his career he painted in the Auvergne region, as well as the Dauphiné and Provence. Boisselier taught drawing at the École spéciale militaire de Saint-Cyr, and maintained a popular studio; he died in Versailles in 1857.

The record price for one of his artworks at auction is $163,932 USD for Vue d’un monastère bénédictin à Subiaco, sold in 2016.

References

Philip Conisbee, Sarah Faunce, and Jeremy Strick. In the Light of Italy: Corot and Early Open-Air Painting. New Haven; Yale University Press, 1996.

External links 

 Gallery of his artworks

19th-century French painters
French male painters
1790 births
1857 deaths
19th-century painters of historical subjects
19th-century French male artists
18th-century French male artists